Norma Reyes Terán (born 8 August 1955) is a Mexican politician from the Party of the Democratic Revolution. From 2000 to 2003 he served as Deputy of the LVIII Legislature of the Mexican Congress representing Oaxaca.

References

1955 births
Living people
Politicians from Oaxaca
Women members of the Chamber of Deputies (Mexico)
Party of the Democratic Revolution politicians
20th-century Mexican politicians
20th-century Mexican women politicians
21st-century Mexican politicians
21st-century Mexican women politicians
Benito Juárez Autonomous University of Oaxaca alumni
Members of the Congress of Oaxaca
Deputies of the LVIII Legislature of Mexico
Members of the Chamber of Deputies (Mexico) for Oaxaca